Papilio iswaroides is a species of swallowtail butterfly from the genus Papilio that is found in Malaysia and Sumatra. It was first described by German entomologist Hans Fruhstorfer in 1898.

Subspecies
Papilio iswaroides iswaroides (Sumatra)
Papilio iswaroides curtisi Jordan, 1909 (Peninsular Malaya)

Taxonomy

Papilio iswaroides is a member of the helenus species-group. The members of this clade are
Papilio helenus Linnaeus, 1758 
Papilio iswara White, 1842
Papilio iswaroides Fruhstorfer, 1898
Papilio nephelus Boisduval, 1836
Papilio nubilus Staudinger, 1895
Papilio sataspes C. & R. Felder, 1865

References

iswaroides
Butterflies described in 1898
Butterflies of Indochina
Taxa named by Hans Fruhstorfer